Reel Life is the second album by American pop singer-songwriting duo Boy Meets Girl, released in 1988 by RCA Records/BMG. The album features the duo's sole top ten hit as a recording act, "Waiting for a Star to Fall," as well as the minor follow-up, "Bring Down the Moon."

Like the duo's previous album, all of the tracks were written entirely by George Merrill and Shannon Rubicam.

Track listing
All titles published by Irving Music, Inc./Boy Meets Girl Music.

"Bring Down the Moon" − 5:02 (George Merrill, Shannon Rubicam)
"Waiting for a Star to Fall" − 4:32 (Merrill, Rubicam)
"Stormy Love" − 4:36 (Merrill, Rubicam)
"Is Anybody Out There in Love?" − 4:55 (Merrill)
"Stay Forever" − 4:08 (Merrill, Rubicam)
"If You Run" − 4:33 (Merrill, Rubicam)
"One Sweet Dream" − 5:47 (Merrill, Rubicam)
"No Apologies" − 4:25 (Merrill, Rubicam)
"Restless Dreamer" − 4:56 (Merrill, Rubicam)
"Someone's Got to Send Out Love" − 1:56 (Merrill, Rubicam)

Production 
 Arif Mardin – producer (1-4)
 George Merrill – producer (5-10)
 Paul Atkinson – A&R 
 Joey Wolpert – recording, mixing (5, 7, 10)
 Rod Hui – additional recording
 Jim Bredouw – assistant engineer
 Don Tittle – assistant engineer
 Matt Tritto – assistant engineer
 Eric Westfall – assistant engineer
 David Leonard – mixing (1-4, 6, 8, 9)
 Jim Dineen – mix assistant (1-4, 6, 8, 9)
 Kristen Connelly – mix assistant (5, 7, 10)
 Stephen Marcussen – mastering
 Ria Lewerke – creative director 
 Norman Moore – art direction, design 
 Michael Tighe – photography
 Direct Managerment Group – management

Personnel

Boy Meets Girl 
 Shannon Rubicam – vocals
 George Merrill – vocals, acoustic piano (1, 2, 10), synthesizers (1, 2, 3, 5, 7), E-mu Emax (1, 7, 8), bass (2), drum programming (2, 3, 7, 8), sequencing (3, 6, 8), drum sequencing (4), Emax voices (4), Linn 9000 drum machine (5), sampler (5), digital piano (6, 9), E-mu Emulator (10)

Additional musicians 
 Joe Mardin – synthesizers (1, 2, 4), additional programming (3)
 Richard Gibbs – synthesizers (4, 5, 9), sampler (5), voice box solo (6), sound effects (6), rear whistle (9)
 Thomas Hart – programming (10)
 John Goux – guitars (1, 2, 4, 5, 7, 8), Ebow (1), electric guitar (3), dulcimer (7)
 John Morton – guitars (6, 9)
 Eric Williams – mandolin (9)
 Leon Gaer – bass (1, 4, 10)
 Kerry Hatch – synth bass (3), bass (5, 7, 8, 9)
 Kevin McCormick – bass (6)
 Michael Jochum – drums (1, 2, 3, 6, 8, 9), Linn 9000 drum machine (5), bongos (7), brushes (7), cymbal (7)
 Denny Fongheiser – Linn 9000 drum machine (1), drums (2, 3, 4)
 Andy Snitzer – alto saxophone (2), oboe (8)
 Larry Williams – alto saxophone (8)
 Susan Boyd – additional vocals (2, 3, 5)
 Joe Turano – additional vocals (6)
 Bunman – Bunman (10)

Charts

Weekly charts

References

Boy Meets Girl, Reel Life CD liner notes.  RCA, 1988

1988 albums
RCA Records albums
Albums produced by Arif Mardin
Boy Meets Girl (band) albums